The Berloi Waterfall is a small waterfall in the municipality of Aileu, East Timor. It forms part of a minor tributary of the Comoro River.

Geography
The waterfall is located within the suco of Fatisi and the Laulara administrative post in the Aileu municipality, a short distance from Dili, the capital city. The stream that passes over the waterfall is sometimes referred to as the Berloi River or the Berloi-Fatisi River, and is a minor tributary of the Comoro River.

From the base of the waterfall, the stream flows initially in a southwesterly direction for a short distance.

History
His body was thrown into the stream near the waterfall. The following day, 20 August 1975, a group of eight men, who were being detained by Fretilin in Fatisi on suspicion of being spies for the Timorese Democratic Union ( (UDT)), were taken outside. Five of them were killed at the stream, and the remaining three were killed near Fatisi.

Ecology
The waterfall is a habitat, and has been a site for observation and recording, of both rare and abundant species of dragonfly.

See also
 Bandeira Waterfall

References 

Aileu Municipality
Waterfalls of East Timor